Misterton Marshes is a  biological Site of Special Scientific Interest north of Misterton in Leicestershire.

This is one of the largest areas of unimproved wetland in the county. Its large areas of tall fen are dominated by common reed, reed canary grass and lesser pond-sedge. There is also an area of grazed marsh and a stream.

The site is private land with no public access.

References

Sites of Special Scientific Interest in Leicestershire